Niño Greggy Batayola Gelig (born October 29, 1980 in Mabalacat, Pampanga) is a Filipino former professional basketball player in the Philippine Basketball Association. He was drafted 14th overall by Talk 'N Text in 2004.

Player Profile
Gelig played for the Talk N' Text Phone Pals in the 2005-06 PBA season and improved his scoring average from 4.4 points per game to 6.1 points per game as he plays for the Welcoat Dragons. He played 35 games for Welcoat and had 9 starts and was given 16.4 minutes per game. He was released at the end of the 2007-08 PBA season. He was signed by Alaska and will be reunited with his college teammate Cyrus Baguio.

External links
Player Profile
PBA-Online! Profile

1980 births
Living people
Filipino men's basketball players
People from Mabalacat
Basketball players from Pampanga
UST Growling Tigers basketball players
Rain or Shine Elasto Painters players
Shooting guards
Small forwards
TNT Tropang Giga players
Alaska Aces (PBA) players
TNT Tropang Giga draft picks